Tahrunessa Ahmed Abdullah (born 21 April 1937) is a Bangladeshi writer and activist. She is notable for her researches and contribution to an uplift in the lives of women in rural Bangladesh through her various levels of involvement with Bangladesh Academy for Rural Development. In 1978, she became the first Bangladeshi to receive the Ramon Magsaysay Award in the community leadership category.

Early life and education

Abdullah was born on 21 April 1937 in the village of Ghoragachha of Jessore District. Her father Rafiuddin Ahmed was a lawyer. After completing primary education from Calcutta, Ahmed moved to Dhaka with her family. There she attended Kamrunnesa Government Girls High School and afterwards received a Bachelor of Arts from Eden Girls' College, University of Dhaka, in 1958. She then attended the College of Social Welfare and Research Center (also affiliated with Dhaka University and now an institute called the Institute of Social Welfare and Research), receiving her Master of Arts in the school's first graduating class in 1960. In 1966, Ahmed went to the United States to study at Michigan State University, from which she received a Master of Science in agriculture extension education in 1968. Her thesis was entitled, The Place of Evaluation in Comilla Women's Program. This graduate year was underwritten by the Ford Foundation.

Career

Pakistan era
Ahmed's first position after graduation was as Executive Officer of the East Pakistan Council for Child Welfare in Dacca. She organised the Crippled Children's Center which is still in operation. At that time she also wrote the first of the numerous articles she has published on social problems, "School Social Work and Its Scope in East Pakistan." From mid-1961 to 1963 she was District Health Education Officer for the Bureau of Health Education. In pursuit of this interest, she attended, under a US International Cooperation Administration (now Agency for International Development) grant, the American University in Beirut, receiving a Diploma, with Distinction, in Public Health in 1962.

In 1963 Ahmed joined then Pakistan Academy for Rural Development in Comilla as instructor in charge of the recently instituted Women's Program and in that capacity headed the Academy's Women's Education and Home Development Program. The Women's Education and Home Development Program was begun at Comilla Academy in 1962. During her nine years at Comilla, she was responsible for the organisation of village level training programs for women that included adult literacy; health education, sanitation, and nutrition; agricultural extension; creation of cooperatives to promote cottage crafts and other income generating activities. She also developed training courses for government officials on women's problems and health needs in rural East Pakistan (now Bangladesh) and coordinated the overall Comilla Academy training program. For two years she was also in charge of the publication section and for one year served as vice-chairman of the Comilla Khadi Association.

Bangladesh era 

Within this context of crisis Abdullah's excellent experience, a Comilla Academy brought her to the forefront of the rehabilitation of fort after the war. In 1972 she became the Director (Training) of the National Board of the Bangladesh Women's Rehabilitation and Welfare Foundation. During her two years in this capacity she established the Women' Career Training Institute, the first institution in Bangladesh wholly devoted to career training for women. Intended for women war victims it became the training model for the National Board. As director Abdullah was involved in the planning, organisation and execution of all training, production and marketing programs of the institute, and exercised administrative and financial supervision, as well.

After 1974 Abdullah served, under a series of Directors General, as Joint Director in charge of the Women's Program, of Bangladesh's Integrated Rural Development Program (IRDP). Her job has been to develop a national plan for integrating rural women into the nation's economic and social development process. She is well aware that unless women are regarded as an integral, functional part of society, their development, and the development of the nation, will be hampered. Since the beginning she has administered and supervised the program and has been responsible for staff training.

The IRDP was established in 1971 as a national extension of the Comilla Academy model'with important modifications. It organised the villagers into credit and service cooperatives to give them access to government services and to increase their productive abilities. The Women's Program, which was instituted in 1974, received initial funds under the population planning project of the World Bank which saw "direct involvement of women in development as a way to bring down the birth rate."

Due to profound poverty, life expectancy in Bangladesh in the 1970s was estimated at 46 years, and the functional literacy rate was less than 25 percent nationwide'only 5 percent for women. Adrienne Germain, in a report for the Ford Foundation, noted that "over 90 percent of Bengali females live in rural areas and bear the brunt poverty even more than males." In 1974 the median marriage for women was 13.3 years and maternal mortality was "very high. "The school drop-out rate for girls was earlier and higher than for boys, a factor which reduced their opportunity to learn ways and skills improve their lives".

The hypothesis of the Women's Program was that women would have more control over their reproductive lives if they had some economic autonomy. The program set up pilot projects in one thana in each of the 19 districts the country. In each thana it established 10 village-based women's cooperatives. The initial project, begun officially in July 1975, was to last three and a half years; it had a budget of 16,700,000 taka (US$1,670,000 from the International Development Association (the World Bank agency handling soft loans and headquartered in Washington, D.C., US including US$760,000 in foreign exchange, plus US$45,000 allotted the Ford Foundation. By 1978 women's cooperatives were operating in 500 villages, with a total membership of 18,000; 15 women needed to organise a cooperative and the average one today has members. Over the next three years the program hopes to add a thousand more villages to its roster.

The Women's Program is divided into two major activities cooperative and population planning'both of which are supported and coordinated by ABDULLAH and her staff, under the guidance of the IRI director general. In each thana the program is represented by a staff consisting of one deputy project officer and two women inspector who organise and supervise the women's cooperatives and population planning activities in their thana. One male inspector works on male side of the population planning program.

From the beginning Abdullah and her colleagues "found misinformation about rural women to be extraordinarily pervasive and persistent." Abdullah's own early studies of village women were just the beginning; the most fundamental area of misinformation concerned the daily activities of the women. Previous researchers who had questioned male villagers about women had been told they work at "nothing" and know "nothing." Rural women were consequently perceived by all levels of society as ignorant, superstitious and without much work except cooking, cleaning and childbearing. Since the urban elite responsible for economic planning was given to understand that women did no agricultural work'and certainly they appear in the fields only under conditions of the most desperate poverty'women were consistently omitted from planning objectives.

Unfortunately, the information was untrue. Abdullah's workers quickly learned that women are consistently responsible for a significant portion of the family's agricultural endeavour. They are in charge of seed preservation and storage, post-harvest rice-processing and grain storage; vegetable and fruit growing; poultry raising and livestock care; food processing and food preservation; manufacturing of household items such as bedding; house maintenance and repairs, and fuel gathering. In short, as an external study in 1975 revealed, rural women in Bangladesh spend more time than men in productive work when the definition includes child raising and food preparation. As Zeidenstein points out, "since 73 percent of the consumption of rural people is food and 14 percent is housing, it should be obvious how integrated women's economic role is."

The IRDP Women's Program seeks to incorporate women in the development process. It acts on the premise that a subsistence level activity by women can be raised to a commercial activity if a surplus is produced. The cooperatives, which are individual self-help societies rather than communal efforts, therefore provide credit facilities to help women start projects in which they already have expertise'for example, raising poultry, goats or cows'or provide them with improved varieties of seeds or fruit stock.

The credit extended is small, varying between US$15 and US$25, and lent for a period of six months. The women exhibit excellent managerial abilities and are very punctual and regular in repaying their loans. One woman, for example, the wife of a poor labourer and mother of eight, received a loan for Tk300 (about US$l25) to buy a calf. She repaid her loan punctually and took out a second loan which enabled her to buy another. These calves are now milk cows, providing enough milk for her children and a surplus to sell in the market. The cows are also used by her husband to plow a small plot of land which he could not otherwise have cultivated. Her assets have increased tenfold.

Since the Women's Program is part of the Bangladesh population project, Abdullah became a respected voice on the international level on both advancement of women and population planning. In 1975 she attended the Population Planning Communications seminar at the East-West Center, Honolulu; the World Congress for International Women's Year in Berlin, and the International Seminar on Population Communication sponsored by the United Nations Food and Agriculture Organization (FAO) in Colombo, Sri Lanka. The United Nations also invited her in 1976 to be a delegate to the Economic and Social Council of Asia and the Pacific committee meeting on population in Bangkok, and to a U.N. Expert Group Meeting in New York on the "Establishment of an International Research and Training Institute for the Advancement of Women." In 1977 she was invited by the director general of FAO to attend a meeting of experts on "Integration of Rural Women in Development" in Rome, and the following year she attended a consultancy meeting of the U.N. International Labor Organization in Geneva on "Women and Rural Development." That same year she also attended the seminar on Action Research on Women in Rural Development at the University of Sussex, England. For the last three years she has worked as short term consultant to the U.N. Development Program and the U.N. Fund for Population Activities in Lanka, helping the Sri Lanka Mahila Samiti (women's institutes introduced by Dr. Mary H. Rutnam, 1958 Ramon Magsaysay Awardee for Public Service for "her gift of service to the Ceylonese people and example she has set by her full life of dedication as a private citizen the needs of others") develop a production-oriented women's program similar to the one she has developed in Bangladesh.

Throughout the years Abdullah has written more than 15 papers and articles on her work, and co-authored one book, Village Women of Bangladesh' Prospect for Change, written with Sondra Zeidenstein.

One observer has remarked that Abdullah is unusual, not only overcoming her society's traditional suspicion of women who "presume to provide community leadership," but in winning the respect of the male segment of that society. He noted that "she not only is a charismatic person, some of that charisma rubs off on her village staff." A final accolade he adds that in Bangladesh Tahrunnesa Ahmed Abdullah "virtually is unique among both male and female sexes in her community dedication."

Awards

As a recognition of her role in "leading rural Bangladeshi Muslim women from the constraints of purdah toward an equal citizenship and fuller family responsibility" Tahrunnesa Ahmed was awarded Ramon Magsaysay award for community leadership in 1978.

References

General references 
 Abdullah, Tahrunnesa A. Village Women as I Saw Them. Dacca: Ford Foundation. May 1974. (Mimeographed.)
 "Women's Programs in Bangladesh and their Impact on Development." Presentation to Group Discussion. Transcript. Ramon Magsaysay Award Foundation. Manila. 2 September 1978. (Typewritten.)
 Abdullah, Tahrunnesa A., Florence E. McCarthy and Sondra A. Zeidenstein "Programme Assessment and the Development of Women's Programme: The Views of the Action Worker. South and Southeast Asian Seminars on Women and Development. Dacca. March 1977 (Mimeographed.)
 Abdullah, Tahrunnesa A. and Sondra A. Zeldenstein. Finding Ways to Learn about Rural Women: Experiences from a Pilot Project in Bangladesh. Dacca: Ford Foundation. November 1976.
 "Bangladesh Aid Benefits Only Wealthy," Japan Times. 21 June 1977.
 Gerard, Renee. Excerpts from A Feasibility Survey of Productive/Income Generating Activity for Women in Bangladesh. Dacca: Women's Development Program of UNICEF Dacca. October 1977.
 Germain, Adrienne. Women's Roles in Bangladesh Development: A Program Assessment Dacca: Ford Foundation. 1976. (Mimeographed.)
 Jara, Manolo B. "Legislators Shift Attention to 'Population Explosion,' " Times Journal. Manila. 14 June 1979, p. 4.
 McCarthy, Florence. IRDP's Pilot Project in Population Planning and Rural Women's Cooperatives, 3rd Report. Dacca: Integrated Rural Development Programme. 1977.
 "Personality of the Week, Tahrunnesa Abdullah," Bangladesh Observer. 10 September 1978.
 Zeidenstein, Sondra A. "A Bangladesh Project for Rural Women." A talk delivered at a Population Council Seminar, New York City, June 1977.
 Interviews with and letters from persons acquainted with Tahrunnesa Ahmed Abdullah and her work.

1937 births
Living people
Development specialists
People in international development
University of Dhaka alumni
Eden Mohila College alumni
Bangladeshi social workers
Ramon Magsaysay Award winners
20th-century Bangladeshi women writers